Muzzley is an app to control Internet of Things devices. The app, available for iOS, Android and Windows 10 allows to control these devices. They provide third party devices integrations through their API's and SDK's for manufacturers to directly embed into their microcontrollers.

History
Muzzley was founded in March 2012 by Domingos Bruges and Eduardo Pinheiro.

Later that year, they started beta testing and raised their first round of seed investment.

In 2013, the Muzzley team moved to the United States. They also expanded their team and partnered with Intel.

In February 2014, Muzzley received $2.5m in Seed venture capital funding, led by Portugal Ventures. The investment was also backed by Espírito Santo Ventures and Plug and Play Tech Center.

They also nominated Jon Castor as the Chair of the Board and released the second major release of the app, Muzzley V2.0.

On May 1, 2018, Habit Analytics acquired Muzzley for an undisclosed amount.

Compatible Devices 

 Belkin Wemo Switch
 Belkin Wemo Insight Switch
 Belkin Wemo Light Switch
 Belkin Wemo LED Light Bulbs
 Belkin Wemo Maker
 Phillips Hue
 D-Link Cameras
 Trax GPS Tracker
 Tractive GPS Tracker
 Netatmo Weather Station
 Koubachi Plant Care
 GreenIQ Smart Garden Hub
 Withings
 CrockPot Smart Slow Cooker
 Misfit Fitness Trackers
 Mr. Coffee Smart Coffee Maker
 Nest Learning Thermostat
 Nest Protect
 LIFX
 ecobee3
 Automatic
 Mojio
 Egardia
 Chamberlain MyQ
 Connected by TCP
 Rachio Iro
 Insteon
 Milight
 Easybulb
 Futlight
 Qblinks Qmote

References

External links
 Official website
 iOS App
 Android App
 Windows 10 App

Home automation companies
Crowdsourcing
Design companies of the United States
IOS software
Android (operating system) software
Wear OS software
Universal Windows Platform apps
Design companies established in 2012
American companies established in 2012